Blacktronic Science is the third solo album by the former Parliament-Funkadelic keyboardist Bernie Worrell. The album was released by Gramavision Records in 1993.

Production
The album was produced by Worrell and Bill Laswell. It is a P-Funk reunion of sorts, as it contains guest appearances by George Clinton, bassist Bootsy Collins, trombonist Fred Wesley, singer Gary "Mudbone" Cooper, and saxophonist Maceo Parker. Tony Williams played drums on some of the tracks. Sly Dunbar provided the drum loop for "Dissinfordollars".

Critical reception

USA Today deemed the album an "ambitious, wildly eclectic project." The Austin American-Statesman noted that it finds Worrell "extending the Mothership Connection into the hip-hop age, while a couple of string-laden chamber cuts reflect his classical training." 

The Philadelphia Inquirer determined that "Worrell seems to be expanding the definition of funk by juxtaposing it with other traditions ... 'Revelation in Black Light' features [Worrell] playing some lyrical harpsichord with an overlay of strings that has an almost baroque feel to it." The Oregonian wrote that Worrell "uses hip hop and '60s jazz organ stylings as two elements in his alchemical new masterpiece."

Track listing

"Revelation In Black Light" (Worrell)  2:24
"Flex" (Worrell, James Sumbi, Bill Laswell, Mike Small, George Clinton)  6:03
"Time Was (Events in the Elsewhere)" (Worrell, George Clinton, Bill Laswell, Bootsy Collins)  7:20
"Blood Secrets" (Worrell)  6:47
"Dissinfordollars" (Worrell, George Clinton, Bootsy Collins)  6:30
"The Vision" (Worrell, James Sumbi, Mike Small, Bill Laswell)  8:03
"Won't Go Away" (Worrell, Mike Small, Bill Laswell)  5:56
"X-Factor" (Worrell, Maceo Parker)  11:51
"Disappearance" (Worrell)  0:51

Personnel

"Revelation in Black Light"
Harpsichord: Bernie Worrell
Material Strings: Arranged by Bernie Worrell

"Flex"
Organ, Mini Moog: Bernie Worrell
Guitar: Bootsy Collins
Saxophone: Maceo Parker
Trombone: Fred Wesley
Loops: Bill Laswell
Beats: Bill Laswell, Darryl Mack
Vocals: James Sumbi aka J-Sumbi (All & All and Freestyle Fellowship), Mike G, George Clinton, Bootsy Collins, Gary Cooper

"Time Was"
Organ, Synthesizer, Mini Moog, Melodica: Bernie Worrell
Cowbells: Aïyb Dieng
Samples: Bill Laswell
Vocals: Bernie Worrell, George Clinton, Bootsy Collins, Gary Cooper, Debra Barsha

"Blood Secrets"
Organ: Bernie Worrell
Alto Saxophone: Maceo Parker
Drums: Tony Williams

"Dissinfordollars"
Synthesizer, Clavinet, Mini Moog: Bernie Worrell
Guitar: Bootsy Collins
Alto Saxophone: Maceo Parker
Trombone: Fred Wesley
Drum Loop: Sly Dunbar
Chatan: Aĩyb Dieng
Sound Effects: Bill Laswell
Vocals: George Clinton, Bootsy Collins, Gary Cooper

"The Vision"
Clavinet, Synthesizer, Electric Piano: Bernie Worrell
Acoustic Bass: Bootsy Collins
Alto Saxophone: Maceo Parker
Trombone: Fred Wesley
Drum Loop: Sly Dunbar
Talking Drums, Chaton, Cowbells: Aiyb Dieng
Vocals: James Sumbi, Mike G

"Won't Go Away"
Synthesizer, Clavinet, Mini Moog: Bernie Worrell
Material Strings: Arranged by Bernie Worrell
Guitar: Bootsy Collins
Loops: Bill Laswell
Vocals: Mike G, George Clinton, Gary Cooper

"X-Factor"
Organ: Bernie Worrell
Flute, Alto Saxophone: Maceo Parker
Drums: Tony Williams

"Disappearance" 
Material Strings-arranged by Bernie Worrell
Conducted by Karl Berger

References 

Bernie Worrell albums
1993 albums
Gramavision Records albums
Albums produced by Bill Laswell